The Château du Fresne-Camilly is a château located in the municipality of Le Fresne-Camilly in the French department of Calvados.

History 
It was built in the first half of the 17th century for the Blouet family of Camilly, and replaced a medieval building. It was burnt down during the French Revolution in 1792 but was rebuilt at the beginning of the 19th century for Count Leforestier d'Osseville.

Architecture 
The building is built in Creully Limestone. The dovecote, chapel, cellars and moats are all older than the current 19th-century building. The dovecote has lost its roof but is still well preserved.

References

Châteaux in Calvados (department)